Elena Nikoli (born May 12, 1982) is a Greek handball player. She has won the Greek championship six times, as well as the Greek cup (1998–2003). She took the third place at the Balkan Games in 2004 and she also participated at the Athens 2004 Olympic Games. She was first called at the Greece men's national handball team in 1998 at the age of 16 years. She played at the following teams: Amazones Artas, Anagennisi Artas and Ormi Patras.

References 

1982 births
Living people
Greek female handball players
Olympic handball players of Greece
Handball players at the 2004 Summer Olympics
Sportspeople from Arta, Greece